The 1937–38 Irish Cup was the 58th edition of the premier knock-out cup competition in Northern Irish football. 

Belfast Celtic won the tournament for the 4th time and second consecutive season, defeating Bangor 2–0 in the final replay at Solitude after the first match ended in a draw.

Results

First round

|}

Replay

|}

Quarter-finals

|}

Replay

|}

Second replay

|}

Semi-finals

|}

Replay

|}

Final

Replay

References

External links
 Northern Ireland Cup Finals. Rec.Sport.Soccer Statistics Foundation (RSSSF)

Irish Cup seasons
1937–38 domestic association football cups
1937–38 in Northern Ireland association football